Marsupidium is a liverwort genus in the family Acrobolbaceae.

References

External links 

Jungermanniales
Jungermanniales genera